The Dark Tower is a 1943 British thriller film starring Ben Lyon, Anne Crawford, David Farrar and Herbert Lom. The film marked Herbert Lom's first major film role.

Plot
Stephen Torg seeks work at a struggling traveling circus. While there, a lion escapes; Torg is able to control it with his skill at hypnotism. Phil Danton, the head of the circus, is so impressed, he hires the newcomer. Then someone comes up with an idea. Torg hypnotizes Mary so that she can perform a dangerous aerial stunt without props. Her partner and boyfriend, Tom Danton is suspicious, but is overruled by the others.

With Torg's help, the circus becomes very successful, and Torg is able to force Phil into making him a partner. Meanwhile, Torg falls in love with Mary, though she makes it clear to him that her heart belongs to Tom. As time goes on, Torg begins to exert control over Mary. Before one performance, he tells her under hypnosis that she will be so tired that she will be unable to hold onto Tom during their trapeze act. As a result, Tom falls and is injured so badly, he has to stay in the hospital. The others suspect what is going on, but have no proof and are powerless to do anything.

When Tom recovers enough to return to the circus, he finds that Torg has Mary performing an even more dangerous stunt. While watching it, he unthinkingly cries out her name, breaking her trance and almost causing her fall from the high wire. While Torg is being lowered to the ground, Phil cuts the rope and Torg falls to his death. However, in a twist, the doctor reveals that Torg was shot in the head in mid-air, a feat that could only have been done by the circus's sharpshooter, Dora.

Cast
 Ben Lyon as Phil Danton
 Anne Crawford as Mary
 David Farrar as Tom Danton
 Herbert Lom as Stephen Torg
 Frederick Burtwell as Colonel Willie Wainwright
 William Hartnell as Jimmy Powers
 Josephine Wilson as Dora Shogun
 Elsie Wagstaff as Eve
 J.H. Roberts as Dr. Wilson
 Aubrey Mallalieu as Doctor

Critical reception
Aveleyman called the film an "enjoyable little B-film with noir overtones, with some excellent performances. Lyon may be top-billed, but this is Lom's film all the way. Too bad much of the rest is strictly routine."

References

External links 
 
 The Dark Tower at TCM
 
 

1943 films
1940s thriller drama films
British black-and-white films
Circus films
Films directed by John Harlow
British thriller drama films
Films about hypnosis
Films scored by Jack Beaver
1943 drama films
1940s British films